Lug is a village in the municipality of Tomislavgrad in Canton 10, the Federation of Bosnia and Herzegovina, Bosnia and Herzegovina. The majority of its inhabitants are Croats.

Geography 

The village is located by the mountain of Ljubuša, on the banks of the river Šujica. The first bridge over the river was built on 20 September 1986.

Demographics 

According to the 2013 census, its population was 243.

Footnotes

Bibliography 

 

Populated places in Tomislavgrad